Stuck on an Island is the second studio album by Miami hip hop/rock collective ¡Mayday!, and was released via Latchkey Recordings. It is ¡Mayday!'s first album to feature the six man line-up of Bernz (vocals), Wrekonize (vocals), Plex Luthor (Producer, Keyboards, Guitarist), Gianni Cash (Producer, Bassist), NonMS (Percussionist) and L T Hopkins (Drummer). Their first album "¡Mayday!", which was released in 2006, only featured Bernz and Plex Luthor.

Track listing

External links
Prefixmag.com
Maydayoline.com
Pcm-music.com

2010 albums
¡Mayday! albums